Henry Mordaunt may refer to:
Henry Mordaunt, 2nd Earl of Peterborough (16211697), an English soldier, peer and courtier
Henry Mordaunt (Royal Navy officer) (d. 1710), an English politician and naval officer
Sir Henry Mordaunt, 12th Baronet (18671939), an English baronet and cricketer